New Eyes is the debut studio album by English electronic music group Clean Bandit, released on 30 May 2014 by Atlantic Records in Germany and Ireland, and 2 June 2014 in the United Kingdom, after suffering from several setbacks. The album includes the singles "A+E", "Mozart's House", "Dust Clears", "Rather Be", "Extraordinary" and "Come Over". New Eyes was produced entirely by group members Jack Patterson and Grace Chatto. The album peaked at number three on the UK Albums Chart and was certified gold by the British Phonographic Industry (BPI) for shipments in excess of 100,000 copies. It is the band's only album to feature violinist and pianist Neil Amin-Smith, who left the band in 2016.

Background and release
The album was named after Noailles, a neighbourhood of Marseille in France where band members Jack Patterson and Grace Chatto regularly visit on holiday.

Singles
The album's lead single, "A+E", was released on 7 December 2012 and features vocals from Kandaka Moore and Nikki Cislyn. It was their first appearance on the UK Singles Chart, peaking at number 100. "Mozart's House" was re-released on 29 March 2013 as the album's second single. The track includes part of the String Quartet No. 21 by Wolfgang Amadeus Mozart. The third single, "Dust Clears", was released on 19 July 2013, featuring vocals from Noonie Bao.

"Rather Be", featuring vocals from Jess Glynne, was released on 17 January 2014 as the album's fourth single and spent four weeks at number one in the UK, selling over 1.1 million copies since release. The album's fifth single, "Extraordinary", features vocals from Sharna Bass and was released on 16 May 2014. The album's sixth single, released on 8 August 2014 after the album's release, was "Come Over" and features vocals from Stylo G.

A seventh single, titled "Real Love", was released on 16 November 2014 as part of the special edition re-release of New Eyes. It is a joint single with Jess Glynne.

The album's eighth and final single, "Stronger", features uncredited vocals by Alex Newell and Sean Bass and was released on 13 February 2015. It was originally released on 22 November 2014, featuring uncredited vocals from Olly Alexander, the lead singer of Years & Years.  The new version of the song was included on the second re-release of New Eyes in 2015.

Critical reception

Upon release, New Eyes received mixed reviews from music critics. According to Metacritic, the album received an average score of 59/100 based on 11 reviews. Lewis Corner for Digital Spy gave the album 4 out of 5 stars and praised the album, commenting that Clean Bandit have "delivered a shimmering debut that follows the cardinal rules of pop: great melodies, simple messages and plenty of hooks". The Guardian writer Alexis Petridis gave the album 2 out of 5 stars commented, "They think they can save dance music but have no hooks, songs or lyrics – just dodgy string arrangements". He also noted that the album might have worked better as an instrumental album, partly due to its "uniformly awful" lyrics and that the group could be "capable of making a far more interesting album".

Joe Zadeh for Clash magazine gave the album a 3 out of 10 and described the classical elements of the album as "independently pleasing" but also commented that its "magpie production makes for a mess of a debut album". Kate Mossoman of The Observer gave the album 3 out of 5 stars and noted that "New Eyes is proof that you can get away with pretty much anything as long as you're clever about it. Even in its more ordinary moments, it's still a classical gas." Nick Levine of Time Out London gave the album 4 out of 5 stars and described it as "classy" sounding and also "warm, inviting and frequently very catchy".

Track listing

Special edition

2015 re-release

Personnel
Credits adapted from the liner notes of New Eyes.

 Noonie Bao – vocals
 Sharna Bass – vocals
 Grace Chatto – cello, producer, backing vocals, vocals
 Nikki Cislyn – vocals
 Wez Clarke – mixing, programming
 Steve Dub – mixing
 Stylo G – vocals
 Jess Glynne – vocals
 Jake Gordon – engineer
 Lewis Hopkin – mastering
 Javeon – vocals
 Matt de Jong – art direction, design
 Lizzo – vocals
 Matt Maguire – viola
 Kandaka Moore – vocals
 Benedict Morgan – photography
 Rae Morris – vocals
 Jimmy Napes – vocals
 Liam Nolan – engineer
 Jack Patterson – producer, mixing, keyboards, piano, vocals, art direction, bass, body percussion, Sega Gamegear, steel drums
 Luke Patterson – drums
 Beatrice Philips – violin
 Mark Ralph – co-producer, mixing
 Florence Rawlings – backing vocals
 Eliza Shaddad – vocals
 Brett Shaw – engineer
 Neil Amin-Smith – violin
 Love Ssega – vocals
 Anthony Strong – piano
 Elisabeth Troy – vocals
 Ian Watt – management
 John Webber – mastering
 Alistair White – management
 Asher Zaccardelli – viola

Charts

Weekly charts

Year-end charts

Certifications

Release history

References

2014 debut albums
Atlantic Records albums
Clean Bandit albums